Vele is a village in Wallis and Futuna. It is located in Alo District on the southeastern coast of Futuna Island. Its population according to the 2018 census was 209 people.

See also
Pointe Vele Airport

References

Populated places in Wallis and Futuna